Following is a list of Czech restaurants:

 Bohemian Cafe
 Czech Stop and Little Czech Bakery
 La Degustation
 Swoboda Bakery
 Vltava

 
Lists of ethnic restaurants